North County Mall (formerly known as North County Fair, Westfield Shoppingtown North County, & Westfield North County) is a shopping mall in Escondido, California owned by Steerpoint Capital. The anchor stores are Macy's, Target, JCPenney, and 24 Hour Fitness. There are 2 vacant anchor stores that were once Sears and Nordstrom.

History
1980s

The mall originally opened in February 1986 with JCPenney, May Company, Nordstrom, J.W. Robinson's, Sears, and The Broadway as its original anchors. Two separate bank buildings were part of the development and located on the northern side of the mall but have since been demolished and replaced with additional parking.

1990s

In 1993, both the Robinson's and May Company anchors became Robinsons-May locations. In 1996, The Broadway became Macy's.

2000s

Westfield dropped the “Shoppingtown” from the names of all centers they operated in June 2005. In 2006, following Federated Department Stores' merger with May Company, the two Robinsons-May locations closed. The former Robinson's location has been subdivided into Forever 21, H&M and Old Navy, while the former May Company location is now Target. 

2010s

North County Tavern + Bowl opened on the second level of the mall in December 2010, replacing Oggi's Pizza & Brewing Co. and three adjacent stores. The 15,000 square foot facility encompassed a 300-seat restaurant, a 30-foot bar, and eight bowling lanes. The tavern closed in 2017 and was replaced by a Comic Book and Memorabilia store.

In 2012, Westfield announced a $55 million revitalization plan and included renovating the mall's interior, updating the exterior mall entrances, and resurfacing the parking lot.

2020s

On May 8, 2020, it was announced that the Nordstrom store would be permanently closing as part of a plan to close 16 locations nationwide. The store closed in June 2020.
 
On June 22, 2020, it was announced that Sears would also be closing as part of a plan to close 28 stores nationwide. The store closed on September 6, 2020, leaving Target, Macy's, and JCPenney as the mall's remaining anchors. This was the last remaining Sears store in San Diego County.

In June 2022, plans were announced for Costco Wholesale to lease the old Sears parcel.

On February 7, 2023, it was announced that Westfield had sold the mall to a joint venture of Bridge Group Investments, LLC and Steerpoint Capital, with Spinoso Real Estate Group taking over management duties. As part of the sale, the Westfield name was removed from the mall, and it was renamed to North County Mall.

Anchors
JCPenney (2 floors)
Macy's (3 floors)
Target (3 floors)

Former anchors
J.W. Robinson's (3 floors) (became Robinsons-May North (Mens/Childrens/Home))
May Company (3 floors) (became Robinsons-May South (Womens))
Nordstrom (3 floors) (closed in June 2020 due to restructuring plan from COVID-19 pandemic)
Robinsons-May (North and South) (3 floors) (closed due to Federated's acquisition of May Department Stores Co.)
The Broadway (3 floors) (became Macy's)
Sears (2 floors) (closed on September 6, 2020 due to chain's struggles)

See also
Westfield Plaza Bonita
Fashion Valley Mall
Westfield UTC
the Shoppes at Carlsbad

References

External links
Westfield North County Official Site

Escondido, California
North County
Shopping malls in San Diego County, California
Shopping malls established in 1986